Omkar Agnihotri is an Indian Classical harmonium player from Mumbai, Maharashtra. He became known after reaching and participating in a reality show called Sangeet Samrat aired on Zee Yuva channel in June 2017. Acquiring recognition for the Harmonium as a “Solo instrument” is his endeavour. Omkar is an empanelled artiste Indian Council for Cultural Relations (ICCR) and also a graded artiste of All Indian Radio.

Early life and training 
Agnihotri was born to Uday Agnihotri, a Tabla player and Manisha Agnihotri, an Indian classical Vocalist.  His grandfather Surmani Pt. Uttamrao Agnihotri was a Hindustani classical vocalist and harmonium player.  He also started taking Taleem of Mewati Gharana from the Khalifa of Mewati Gharana Ustad Siraj Khan.  Along with the harmonium he also picked up a passion for piano, keyboard and pianica/ melodica. He took piano lessons from Adwait Biwalkar and keyboard lessons from Nilesh Dewasthali.

Career 
He is a winner of the special prize in All India Radio competition 2017 and has awarded with B grade of AIR in harmonium category.

Agnihotri has selected as an empanelled artist of Indian Council for Cultural Relation (ICCR) at 21. Agnihotri has also worked with Hindi rock band called as 'Tapas'. He has also composed a fusion tracks called Korwai on harmonium and Malhar Reprise.

Sangeet Samrat 
In 2017, Agnihotri auditioned for Sangeet Samrat, a reality show organised by Zee Yuva. He was one of final 60 who were selected  amongst several thousand participants across Maharashtra. He was the only harmonium player selected across Maharashtra for the season.  Agnihotri was placed amongst the top 24 participants in sangeet samrat and considered to be one of the participant of Chamakdar Chowis (top 24).

Harmonium solo performances 
 NCPA Promising Artistes Series - 2019 
 Surmani Pt. Uttamrao Agnihotri Sangeet Mahotsav
 Nirantar Sangeet Mahotsav 2021
 PRINT WEEK INDIA AWARDS 2018

Awards and Recognitions 
 Hridayesh Arts Award 2014

References

External links 

Indian classical musicians
Harmonium players
Living people
Year of birth missing (living people)